Love Is Dead is an album by the Berkeley, California punk rock band The Mr. T Experience, released in 1996 by Lookout! Records. It was the band's second album as a three-piece, and the first with bassist Joel Reader and drummer Jim "Jym" Pittman, replacing Aaron Rubin and Alex Laipeneiks, respectively, who had departed the group the previous year.

The song "I Just Wanna Do it With You" was used in the soundtrack to the 1996 movie Glory Daze, and was included on the film's soundtrack album.

Critical reception
Trouser Press called the release "a wonderful album," writing that "Dr. Frank and a half-new rhythm section fill Love Is Dead with nothing but loud, catchy and lovable singalongs, roaringly produced by [Kevin] Army as if he were erecting the sonic safety barrier around a particularly dangerous radioactive dumpsite." Metroactive called it "the year's can't-miss record, an addictive tome about self-loathing."

In an appreciation published in 2004, Stylus Magazine wrote that the album "is easily the finest work of the second wave of US punk, and arguably one of the finest Stateside three-chord racket albums ever dropped on wax."

Track listing

Personnel
Dr. Frank - vocals, guitar
Joel Reader - bass
Jim "Jym" Pittman - drums
Paige O'Donoghue - triangle on "Can I Do the Thing?"

Album information
Produced and engineered by Kevin Army
Mixed by Kevin Army and Bernd Burgdorf at Hyde Street Studios
Assistant tracking engineer: Jim Ruzicka
Additional assistant engineer: Marty Main
Mastered by John Golden at Newbury Park, California on October 31, 1995
Recorded at Bay Records, Emeryville Recording Company in Emeryville, California, and Smooth Hyde Street Studios
Artwork by Christopher Appelgren, Dr. Frank, and others
Back cover photo by Cathy Bauer
Live photos by Brian Medley and Robyn Draheim

References

The Mr. T Experience albums
1996 albums